Xerocomus is a genus of poroid fungi related to Boletus.  Many mycologists did not originally recognize the distinction between the two genera and placed Xerocomus taxa in genus Boletus. However, several molecular phylogenetic studies have demonstrated that Xerocomus is a heterogeneous genus of polyphyletic origin, which has resulted in further division of Xerocomus into Xerocomellus and Hemileccinum. The members of the genus Xerocomellus are more closely related to Boletus than true Xerocomus is, which is relatively distantly related to Boletus and more closely related to Phylloporus. Other former Xerocomus species have since been moved to Aureoboletus, Imleria, Hortiboletus and Rheubarbariboletus.

Ladurner and Simonini published a monograph on Xerocomus in 2003, but this predated the taxonomical revisions based on phylogenetic inferences. In 2008, Hills included 18 species found in Britain, not including some species sometimes treated as Xerocomus, and including Boletus pulverulentus and Boletus impolitus., currently placed in genera Cyanoboletus and Hemileccinum, respectively. More recent phylogenies have confirmed Xerocomus as monophyletic in its new restricted arrangement.

Most members of Xerocomus are edible, though of mediocre gastronomical value and inferior to the sought-after porcini.

Species 
X. albobrunneus Heinem. & Gooss.-Font. 1951
X. albotessellatus Heinem. 1964
X. alliaceus (Beeli) Heinem. 1951
X. amazonicus Singer 1978
X. anthracinus M.Zang, M.R.Hu & W.P.Liu 1991
X. astereicola Imazeki 1952
X. astraeicolopsis  J.Z.Ying & M.Q.Wang 1981
X. belizensis — Belize
X. chrysonemus
X. cyaneibrunnescens — Guyana
X. ferrugineus
X. griseo-olivaceus — New Zealand
X. guidonis
X. illudens — North America, India and Bangladesh
X. lentistipitatus — New Zealand
X. mcrobbii — New Zealand
X. nothofagi — New Zealand
X. olivaceus — Belize
X. parvogracilis — Guyana
X. porophyllus — China
X. potaroensis — Guyana
X. rufostipitatus — New Zealand
X. silwoodensis (edibility not known, found in England, Spain, and Italy. Named seventh top species of 2008, International Institute for Species Exploration)
X. squamulosus — New Zealand
X. subtomentosus (edible and very common, found in  Eurasia, North America and Australia )
Xerocomus tenax

Description

References

External links 
 The genus Xerocomus
 Xerocomus subtomentosus

Boletaceae
Boletales genera